The Luisa Todí National Singing Competition is a singing contest conceived and founded by José Carlos Xavier, an operatic tenor and singing teacher at the Lisbon National Conservatory of Music.

The contest first took place in 1990, in the city of Setúbal, aiming to honor the Portuguese mezzo-soprano opera singer Luísa Todi.

The biennial competitions aim is the promotion of national and young singers, the jury is made up some of the most prestigious figures of the Portuguese and international music scenes.

History

Contestant awards

Members of the jury

Official pianists

Administrative and logistical support 
 1990-1996: Luisa Todi Academy of Music and Fine Arts ..
 2003-2011: Setúbal City Hall.

External links
 Jornal de Noticias

References 

Singing competitions